Sophona is a genus of moths in the family Sesiidae.

Species
Sophona greenfieldi Eichlin, 1986
Sophona albibasilaris Eichlin, 1986
Sophona canzona Eichlin, 1986
Sophona ceropaliformis (Walker, 1856)
Sophona cyanomyia (Meyrick, 1930a)
Sophona ezodda Eichlin, 1986
Sophona flavizonata Zukowsky, 1937
Sophona fusca Eichlin, 1986
Sophona galba Eichlin, 1986
Sophona gilvifasciata Eichlin, 1986
Sophona halictipennis Walker, 1856
Sophona hoffmanni Eichlin, 1986
Sophona hondurasensis Eichlin, 1986
Sophona lemoulti (Le Cerf, 1917)
Sophona leucoteles (Clarke, 1962)
Sophona ludtkei Eichlin, 1986
Sophona manoba (Druce, 1889)
Sophona panzona Eichlin, 1986
Sophona pedipennula Kallies & Riefenstahl, 1999
Sophona piperi Kallies & Riefenstahl, 1999
Sophona snellingi Eichlin, 1986
Sophona tabogana (Druce, 1883)
Sophona xanthocera Eichlin, 1986
Sophona xanthotarsis Eichlin, 1986
Sophona yucatanensis Eichlin, 1986
Sophona zukowskyi Eichlin, 1986

References

Sesiidae